The Karelian United Government (Karjalan keskushallitus) was a short-lived state that existed from 1920 to 1923, as a merger of the Republic of Uhtua and the Olonets Government of Southern Karelia.

History

On 20 December 1920, the Karelian United Government formed in exile in Finland as a merger of the Uhtua Government and the Olonets Government of Southern Karelia. 11 days later, on 31 December, Finland ceded Repola and Porajärvi to the Russian Soviet Socialist Republic.

On 21 April 1921, the Republic of Eastern Karelia (Itä Karjala) was declared independent. Between October 1921 and February 1922 Karelian military troops, supported by the KUG, moved from Finnish territory into Eastern Karelia.

From December 1922 until February 1923 East Karelia was occupied by the Soviet Union.

On 23 July 1923, the Permanent Court of Arbitration refused to state an advisory opinion on the status of Karelia regarding the Treaty of Tartu. Later that year the exile government was dissolved.

References

States and territories established in 1920
States and territories disestablished in 1923
Karelia
History of the Republic of Karelia
1920s in Finland
Russian Civil War